Calypso  refers to:

 Calypso (mythology), a nymph who, famously in Homer's Odyssey, kept Odysseus with her on her island of Ogygia for seven years.
 Calypso (nymphs), other nymphs called Calypso.

Calypso may also refer to:

Companies and brands 
 Calypso (camera), an underwater camera — a precursor to the Nikonos camera
 Calypso (electronic ticketing system), an electronic ticketing system for public transport
 Calypso (email client), later called Courier
 Calypso Park, a Canadian theme waterpark
 Calypso Technology, an American financial services application software company
 Ultracraft Calypso, a Belgian light aircraft design
 Calypso, a drink made by Wisconsin's King Juice Company

Entertainment

Books 
 "Calypso" (Ulysses episode), an episode in James Joyce's novel Ulysses
 Calypso (book), 2018 essay collection by David Sedaris
 Calypso (comics), Marvel Comics character
 Calypso, Camp Half-Blood Chronicles

Music 
 Calypso music, a genre of Trinidadian folk music
 Calypso (album), by Harry Belafonte
 Banda Calypso, a Brazilian musical duo

Songs 
 "Calypso" (John Denver song), written as a tribute to Jacques-Yves Cousteau and his research ship Calypso
 "Calypso" (Luis Fonsi and Stefflon Don song), 2018
 "Calypso" (Spiderbait song), a 1997 single by Australian alt-rock band Spiderbait
 "Calypso", a song by France Gall
 "Calypso", a song by Jean-Michel Jarre from Waiting for Cousteau
 "Calypso", a song by Suzanne Vega from Solitude Standing
 "Calypso Crazy", a single by Billy Ocean from Tear Down These Walls

Television and film 
 "Calypso" (Star Trek: Short Treks), an episode of Star Trek: Short Treks
 Calypso (TV series), a Venezuelan telenovela
 Calypso, a Pirates of the Caribbean movie character
 "Calypso" (Bluey), an episode of the first season of the animated TV series Bluey

Nature 
 Calypso (moon), a natural satellite of Saturn
 Calypso (plant), an orchid genus containing a single species Calypso bulbosa
 Calypso bean, a kidney bean hybrid also known as the pickle bean, orca bean or yin yang bean

Places 
Calypso Cliffs, rocky cliffs in the Antarctic Peninsula
 Calypso Deep, the deepest point of the Mediterranean Sea
 Calypso's Cave, a cave in Gozo, Malta
 Calypso, North Carolina, a town in the United States

Ships 
 French submarine Calypso
 HMS Calypso, the name of a number of British Royal Navy ships
 MS The Calypso, a cruise ship
 MV Calypsoland, a ferry of E. Zammit & Sons Ltd and later the Gozo Channel Line between 1969 and 1984
 RV Calypso, a 1942 British minesweeper and later an oceanographic research ship operated by Jacques-Yves Cousteau
 UNS Calypso, fictitious starship commanded by the player in the 1994 sci-fi strategy game Alien Legacy
 USS Calypso, the name of various United States Navy ships

Other
 Calypso, a character from the Twisted Metal video game series
 Calypso, a name given by Sunita Williams to the CST-100 Starliner spacecraft used for the Boeing Orbital Flight Test in 2019

Related spellings 
 53 Kalypso, an asteroid
 "Calipso" (song), a 2019 song by Charlie Charles and Dardust featuring Sfera Ebbasta, Mahmood and Fabri Fibra
 CALIPSO, NASA's "Cloud-Aerosol Lidar and Infrared Pathfinder Satellite Observations" satellite
 Chalypso, a dance
 Kalypso Media, a video game developer
 Kalypso (software), an open source modelling software